The 2002–03 AFC Champions League was the twenty-second edition of Asia's premier football competition organised by the Asian Football Confederation, and the first edition under the AFC Champions League title.

Sixteen teams competed in this edition as they went through qualifying before going into four groups of four with only the winner of the group qualifying to the knockout-stage which went to two-legs instead of the single leg that the previous year competition had. In the final it was Al-Ain of the United Arab Emirates beating BEC Tero Sasana of Thailand 2–1 on aggregate.

Qualification

West Asia
  Al-Talaba
  Al Sadd
  Al-Hilal
  Al-Ain

Central and Southern Asia
  Esteghlal
  Persepolis
  Nisa Aşgabat
  Pakhtakor

ASEAN
  BEC Tero Sasana
  Osotsapa FC

Group stage

Group A

Group B

Group C

Group D

Knock-out stage

Bracket

Semi-finals

|}

First leg

Second leg

BEC Tero Sasana won 3–2 on aggregate.

Al-Ain won 7–6 on aggregate.

Final

|}

First leg

Second leg

Al-Ain won 2–1 on aggregate.

Top scorers
9
  Hao Haidong (Dalian Shide)
4
  Boubacar Sanogo (Al Ain)
  Therdsak Chaiman (BEC Tero Sasana)
3
  Patrick Suffo (Al-Hilal)
  Mohammad Omar (Al Ain)
  Ali Samereh (Esteghlal)
  Anvarjon Soliev (Pakhtakor)
  Kim Dae-eui (Seongnam Ilhwa Chunma)
  Kim Do-hoon (Seongnam Ilhwa Chunma)
  Saul Martínez (Shanghai Shenhua)
  Ahn Jung-hwan (Shimizu S-Pulse)

Notes

External links 
AFC Champions League 2002/03
AFC Champions League 2002/03 - Final stage

 
2002-03
1
1